Daylight on Saturday is a 1943 novel by the British writer J.B. Priestley. It follows the various employees of an aircraft factory during the Second World War. The title was a reference to the fact that workers only see daylight at the weekends.

References

Bibliography
 Klein, Holger. J.B. Priestley's Fiction. Peter Lang, 2002.

1943 British novels
Novels by J. B. Priestley
Heinemann (publisher) books